Totah is a surname. Notable people with the surname include:

Josie Totah (born 2001), American actress
Mary Totah (1957-2017), American Benedictine prioress of abbey on the Isle of Wight

See also
Totah Vista, New Mexico, unincorporated community in the United States